Problem solving is the process of achieving a goal by overcoming obstacles, a frequent part of most activities. Problems in need of solutions range from simple personal tasks (e.g. how to turn on an appliance) to complex issues in business and technical fields. The former is an example of simple problem solving (SPS) addressing one issue, whereas the latter is complex problem solving (CPS) with multiple interrelated obstacles. Another classification is into well-defined problems with specific obstacles and goals, and ill-defined problems in which the current situation is troublesome but it is not clear what kind of resolution to aim for. Similarly, one may distinguish formal or fact-based problems requiring psychometric intelligence, versus socio-emotional problems which depend on the changeable emotions of individuals or groups, such as tactful behavior, fashion, or gift choices.

Solutions require sufficient resources and knowledge to attain the goal. Professionals such as lawyers, doctors, and consultants are largely problem solvers for issues which require technical skills and knowledge beyond general competence. Many businesses have found profitable markets by recognizing a problem and creating a solution: the more widespread and inconvenient the problem, the greater the opportunity to develop a scalable solution.

There are many specialized problem-solving techniques and methods in fields such as engineering, business, medicine, mathematics, computer science, philosophy, and social organization. The mental techniques to identify, analyze, and solve problems are studied in psychology and cognitive sciences. Additionally, the mental obstacles preventing people from finding solutions is a widely researched topic: problem solving impediments include confirmation bias, mental set, and functional fixedness.

Definition 
The term problem solving has a slightly different meaning depending on the discipline. For instance, it is a mental process in psychology and a computerized process in computer science. There are two different types of problems: ill-defined and well-defined; different approaches are used for each. Well-defined problems have specific end goals and clearly expected solutions, while ill-defined problems do not. Well-defined problems allow for more initial planning than ill-defined problems. Solving problems sometimes involves dealing with pragmatics, the way that context contributes to meaning, and semantics, the interpretation of the problem. The ability to understand what the end goal of the problem is, and what rules could be applied represents the key to solving the problem. Sometimes the problem requires abstract thinking or coming up with a creative solution.

Psychology 
Problem solving in psychology refers to the process of finding solutions to problems encountered in life. Solutions to these problems are usually situation or context-specific. The process starts with problem finding and problem shaping, where the problem is discovered and simplified. The next step is to generate possible solutions and evaluate them. Finally a solution is selected to be implemented and verified. Problems have an end goal to be reached and how you get there depends upon problem orientation (problem-solving coping style and skills) and systematic analysis. Mental health professionals study the human problem solving processes using methods such as introspection, behaviorism, simulation, computer modeling, and experiment. Social psychologists look into the person-environment relationship aspect of the problem and independent and interdependent problem-solving methods. Problem solving has been defined as a higher-order cognitive process and intellectual function that requires the modulation and control of more routine or fundamental skills.

Problem solving has two major domains: mathematical problem solving and personal problem solving. Both are seen in terms of some difficulty or barrier that is encountered. Empirical research shows many different strategies and factors influence everyday problem solving. Rehabilitation psychologists studying individuals with frontal lobe injuries have found that deficits in emotional control and reasoning can be re-mediated with effective rehabilitation and could improve the capacity of injured persons to resolve everyday problems. Interpersonal everyday problem solving is dependent upon the individual personal motivational and contextual components. One such component is the emotional valence of "real-world" problems and it can either impede or aid problem-solving performance. Researchers have focused on the role of emotions in problem solving, demonstrating that poor emotional control can disrupt focus on the target task and impede problem resolution and likely lead to negative outcomes such as fatigue, depression, and inertia. In conceptualization, human problem solving consists of two related processes: problem orientation and the motivational/attitudinal/affective approach to problematic situations and problem-solving skills. Studies conclude people's strategies cohere with their goals and stem from the natural process of comparing oneself with others.

Cognitive sciences 
Among the first experimental psychologists to study problem solving were the Gestaltists in Germany, e.g., Karl Duncker in The Psychology of Productive Thinking (1935). Perhaps best known is the work of Allen Newell and Herbert A. Simon.

Experiments the 1960s and early 1970s asked participants to solve relatively simple, well-defined, but not previously seen laboratory tasks. These simple problems, such as the Tower of Hanoi, admitted optimal solutions which could be found quickly, allowing observation of the full problem-solving process. Researchers assumed that these model problems would elicit the characteristic cognitive processes by which more complex "real world" problems are solved.

An outstanding problem solving technique found by this research is the principle of decomposition.

Computer science 

Much of computer science and artificial intelligence involves designing automatic systems to solve a specified type of problem: to accept input data and calculate a correct or adequate response, reasonably quickly. Algorithms are recipes or instructions that direct such systems, written into computer programs.

Steps for designing such systems include problem determination, heuristics, root cause analysis, de-duplication, analysis, diagnosis, and repair. Analytic techniques include linear and nonlinear programming, queuing systems, and simulation. A large, perennial obstacle is to find and fix errors in computer programs: debugging.

Logic 
Formal logic is concerned with such issues as validity, truth, inference, argumentation and proof. In a problem-solving context, it can be used to formally represent a problem as a theorem to be proved, and to represent the knowledge needed to solve the problem as the premises to be used in a proof that the problem has a solution. The use of computers to prove mathematical theorems using formal logic emerged as the field of automated theorem proving in the 1950s. It included the use of heuristic methods designed to simulate human problem solving, as in the Logic Theory Machine, developed by Allen Newell, Herbert A. Simon and J. C. Shaw, as well as algorithmic methods such as the resolution principle developed by John Alan Robinson.

In addition to its use for finding proofs of mathematical theorems, automated theorem-proving has also been used for program verification in computer science. However, already in 1958, John McCarthy proposed the advice taker, to represent information in formal logic and to derive answers to questions using automated theorem-proving. An important step in this direction was made by Cordell Green in 1969, using a resolution theorem prover for question-answering and for such other applications in artificial intelligence as robot planning.

The resolution theorem-prover used by Cordell Green bore little resemblance to human problem solving methods. In response to criticism of his approach, emanating from researchers at MIT, Robert Kowalski developed logic programming and SLD resolution, which solves problems by problem decomposition. He has advocated logic for both computer and human problem solving and computational logic to improve human thinking

Engineering 
Problem solving is used when products or processes fail, so corrective action can be taken to prevent further failures. It can also be applied to a product or process prior to an actual failure event—when a potential problem can be predicted and analyzed, and mitigation applied to prevent the problem. Techniques such as failure mode and effects analysis can proactively reduce the likelihood of problems.

Forensic engineering is an important technique of failure analysis that involves tracing product defects and flaws. Corrective action can then be taken to prevent further failures.

Reverse engineering attempts to discover the original problem-solving logic used in developing a product by taking it apart.

Military science 
In military science, problem solving is linked to the concept of "end-states", the condition or situation which is the aim of the strategy. Ability to solve problems is important at any military rank, but is essential at the command and control level, where it results from deep qualitative and quantitative understanding of possible scenarios. Effectiveness is evaluation of results, whether the goal was accomplished. Planning is the process of determining how to achieve the goal.

Processes 
Some models of problem solving involve identifying a goal and then a sequence of subgoals towards achieving this goal. Andersson, who introduced the ACT-R model of cognition, modelled this collection of goals and subgoals as a goal stack, where the mind contains a stack of goals and subgoals to be completed with a single task being carried out at any time.

It has been observed that knowledge of how to solve one problem can be applied to another problem, in a process known as transfer.

Problem-solving strategies 

Problem-solving strategies are steps to overcoming the obstacles to achieving a goal, the "problem-solving cycle".

Common steps in this cycle include recognizing the problem, defining it, developing a strategy to fix it, organizing knowledge and resources available, monitoring progress, and evaluating the effectiveness of the solution. Once a solution is achieved, another problem usually arises, and the cycle starts again.

Insight is the sudden aha! solution to a problem, the birth of a new idea to simplify a complex situation. Solutions found through insight are often more incisive than those from step-by-step analysis. A quick solution process requires insight to select productive moves at different stages of the problem-solving cycle. Unlike Newell and Simon's formal definition of a move problem, there is no consensus definition of an insight problem.

Some problem-solving strategies include:
 Abstraction: solving the problem in a tractable model system to gain insight into the real system
 Analogy: adapting the solution to a previous problem which has similar features or mechanisms
 Brainstorming: (especially among groups of people) suggesting a large number of solutions or ideas and combining and developing them until an optimum solution is found
 Critical thinking
 Divide and conquer: breaking down a large, complex problem into smaller, solvable problems
 Hypothesis testing: assuming a possible explanation to the problem and trying to prove (or, in some contexts, disprove) the assumption
 Lateral thinking: approaching solutions indirectly and creatively
 Means-ends analysis: choosing an action at each step to move closer to the goal
 Morphological analysis: assessing the output and interactions of an entire system
 Proof of impossibility: try to prove that the problem cannot be solved. The point where the proof fails will be the starting point for solving it
 Reduction: transforming the problem into another problem for which solutions exist
 Research: employing existing ideas or adapting existing solutions to similar problems
 Root cause analysis: identifying the cause of a problem
 Trial-and-error: testing possible solutions until the right one is found
 Help-seeking

Problem-solving methods 

 Eight Disciplines Problem Solving
 GROW model
 How to Solve It
 Lateral thinking
 OODA loop (observe, orient, decide, and act)
 PDCA (plan–do–check–act)
 Root cause analysis
 RPR problem diagnosis (rapid problem resolution)
 TRIZ
 A3 problem solving
 System dynamics
 Hive mind
 Design Thinking
 Help-seeking

Common barriers
Common barriers to problem solving are mental constructs that impede an efficient search for solutions. Five of the most common identified by researchers are: confirmation bias, mental set, functional fixedness, unnecessary constraints, and irrelevant information.

Confirmation bias

Confirmation bias is an unintentional tendency to collect and use data which favors preconceived notions. Such notions may be incidental rather than motivated by important personal beliefs: the desire to be right may be sufficient motivation. Research has found that scientific and technical professionals also experience confirmation bias.

Andreas Hergovich, Reinhard Schott, and Christoph Burger's experiment conducted online, for instance, suggested that professionals within the field of psychological research are likely to view scientific studies that agree with their preconceived notions more favorably than clashing studies. According to Raymond Nickerson, one can see the consequences of confirmation bias in real-life situations, which range in severity from inefficient government policies to genocide. Nickerson argued that those who killed people accused of witchcraft demonstrated confirmation bias with motivation. Researcher Michael Allen found evidence for confirmation bias with motivation in school children who worked to manipulate their science experiments to produce favorable results.

However, confirmation bias does not necessarily require motivation. In 1960, Peter Cathcart Wason conducted an experiment in which participants first viewed three numbers and then created a hypothesis that proposed a rule that could have been used to create that triplet of numbers. When testing their hypotheses, participants tended to only create additional triplets of numbers that would confirm their hypotheses, and tended not to create triplets that would negate or disprove their hypotheses.

Mental set

Mental set is the inclination to re-use a previously successful solution, rather than search for new and better solutions. It is a reliance on habit.

It was first articulated by Abraham Luchins in the 1940s with his well-known water jug experiments. Participants were asked to fill one jug with a specific amount of water using other jugs with different maximum capacities. After Luchins gave a set of jug problems that could all be solved by a single technique, he then introduced a problem that could be solved by the same technique, but also by a novel and simpler method. His participants tended to use the accustomed technique, oblivious of the simpler alternative. This was again demonstrated in Norman Maier's 1931 experiment, which challenged participants to solve a problem by using a familiar tool (pliers) in an unconventional manner. Participants were often unable to view the object in a way that strayed from its typical use, a type of mental set known as functional fixedness (see the following section).

Rigidly clinging to a mental set is called fixation, which can deepen to an obsession or preoccupation with attempted strategies that are repeatedly unsuccessful. In the late 1990s, researcher Jennifer Wiley found that professional expertise in a field can create a mental set, perhaps leading to fixation.

Groupthink, where each individual takes on the mindset of the rest of the group, can produce and exacerbate mental set. Social pressure leads to everybody thinking the same thing and reaching the same conclusions.

Functional fixedness

Functional fixedness is the tendency to view an object as having only one function, unable to conceive of any novel use, as in the Maier pliers experiment above. Functional fixedness is a specific form of mental set, and is one of the most common forms of cognitive bias in daily life.

Tim German and Clark Barrett describe this barrier: "subjects become 'fixed' on the design function of the objects, and problem solving suffers relative to control conditions in which the object's function is not demonstrated." Their research found that young children's limited knowledge of an object's intended function reduces this barrier Research has also discovered functional fixedness in many educational instances, as an obstacle to understanding. Furio, Calatayud, Baracenas, and Padilla stated: "... functional fixedness may be found in learning concepts as well as in solving chemistry problems."

As an example, imagine a man wants to kill a bug in is house, but the only thing at hand is a can of air freshener. He may start searching for something to kill the bug instead of squashing it with the can, thinking only of its main function of deodorizing.

There are several hypotheses in regards to how functional fixedness relates to problem solving. It may waste time, delaying or entirely preventing the correct use of a tool.

Unnecessary constraints
Unnecessary constraints are arbitrary boundaries imposed unconsciously on the task at hand, which foreclose a productive avenue of solution. The solver may become fixated on only one type of solution, as if it were an inevitable requirement of the problem. Typically, this combines with mental set, clinging to a previously successful method.

Visual problems can also produce mentally invented constraints. A famous example is the dot problem: nine dots arranged in a three-by-three grid pattern must be connected by drawing four straight line segments, without lifting pen from paper or backtracking along a line. The subject typically assumes the pen must stay within the outer square of dots, but the solution requires lines continuing beyond this frame, and researchers have found a 0% solution rate within a brief allotted time.

This problem has produced the expression "think outside the box". Such problems are typically solved via a sudden insight which leaps over the mental barriers, often after long toil against them. This can be difficult depending on how the subject has structured the problem in their mind, how they draw on past experiences, and how well they juggle this information in their working memory. In the example, envisioning the dots connected outside the framing square requires visualizing an unconventional arrangement, a strain on working memory.

Irrelevant information

Irrelevant information is a specification or data presented in a problem that is unrelated to the solution. If the solver assumes that all information presented needs to be used, this often derails the problem solving process, making relatively simple problems much harder.

For example: "Fifteen percent of the people in Topeka have unlisted telephone numbers. You select 200 names at random from the Topeka phone book. How many of these people have unlisted phone numbers?" The "obvious" answer is 15%, but in fact none of the unlisted people would be listed among the 200. This kind of "trick question" is often used in aptitude tests or cognitive evaluations. Though not inherently difficult, they require independent thinking that is not necessarily common. Mathematical word problems often include irrelevant qualitative or numerical information as an extra challenge.

Avoiding barriers by changing problem representation 
The disruption caused by the above cognitive biases can depend on how the information is represented: visually, verbally, or mathematically. A classic example is the Buddhist monk problem:

A Buddhist monk begins at dawn one day walking up a mountain, reaches the top at sunset, meditates at the top for several days until one dawn when he begins to walk back to the foot of the mountain, which he reaches at sunset. Making no assumptions about his starting or stopping or about his pace during the trips, prove that there is a place on the path which he occupies at the same hour of the day on the two separate journeys.

The problem cannot be addressed in a verbal context, trying to describe the monk's progress on each day. It becomes much easier when the paragraph is represented mathematically by a function: one visualizes a graph whose horizontal axis is time of day, and whose vertical axis shows the monk's position (or altitude) on the path at each time. Superimposing the two journey curves, which traverse opposite diagonals of a rectangle, one sees they must cross each other somewhere. The visual representation by graphing has resolved the difficulty.

Similar strategies can often improve problem solving on tests.

Other barriers for individuals 
Individual humans engaged in problem-solving tend to overlook subtractive changes, including those that are critical elements of efficient solutions. This tendency to solve by first, only or mostly creating or adding elements, rather than by subtracting elements or processes is shown to intensify with higher cognitive loads such as information overload.

Dreaming: problem-solving without waking consciousness 

Problem solving can also occur without waking consciousness. There are many reports of scientists and engineers who solved problems in their dreams. Elias Howe, inventor of the sewing machine, figured out the structure of the bobbin from a dream.

The chemist August Kekulé was considering how benzene arranged its six carbon and hydrogen atoms. Thinking about the problem, he dozed off, and dreamt of dancing atoms that fell into a snakelike pattern, which led him to discover the benzene ring. As Kekulé wrote in his diary,

There also are empirical studies of how people can think consciously about a problem before going to sleep, and then solve the problem with a dream image. Dream researcher William C. Dement told his undergraduate class of 500 students that he wanted them to think about an infinite series, whose first elements were OTTFF, to see if they could deduce the principle behind it and to say what the next elements of the series would be. He asked them to think about this problem every night for 15 minutes before going to sleep and to write down any dreams that they then had. They were instructed to think about the problem again for 15 minutes when they awakened in the morning.

The sequence OTTFF is the first letters of the numbers: one, two, three, four, five. The next five elements of the series are SSENT (six, seven, eight, nine, ten). Some of the students solved the puzzle by reflecting on their dreams. One example was a student who reported the following dream:

With more than 500 undergraduate students, 87 dreams were judged to be related to the problems students were assigned (53 directly related and 34 indirectly related). Yet of the people who had dreams that apparently solved the problem, only seven were actually able to consciously know the solution. The rest (46 out of 53) thought they did not know the solution.

Mark Blechner conducted this experiment and obtained results similar to Dement's. He found that while trying to solve the problem, people had dreams in which the solution appeared to be obvious from the dream, but it was rare for the dreamers to realize how their dreams had solved the puzzle. Coaxing or hints did not get them to realize it, although once they heard the solution, they recognized how their dream had solved it. For example, one person in that OTTFF experiment dreamed:

In the dream, the person counted out the next elements of the series six, seven, eight, nine, ten, eleven, twelve yet he did not realize that this was the solution of the problem. His sleeping mindbrain solved the problem, but his waking mindbrain was not aware how.

Albert Einstein believed that much problem solving goes on unconsciously, and the person must then figure out and formulate consciously what the mindbrain has already solved. He believed this was his process in formulating the theory of relativity: "The creator of the problem possesses the solution." Einstein said that he did his problem-solving without words, mostly in images. "The words or the language, as they are written or spoken, do not seem to play any role in my mechanism of thought. The psychical entities which seem to serve as elements in thought are certain signs and more or less clear images which can be 'voluntarily' reproduced and combined."

Cognitive sciences: two schools 

In cognitive sciences, researchers' realization that problem-solving processes differ across knowledge domains and across levels of expertise and that, consequently, findings obtained in the laboratory cannot necessarily generalize to problem-solving situations outside the laboratory, has led to an emphasis on real-world problem solving since the 1990s. This emphasis has been expressed quite differently in North America and Europe, however. Whereas North American research has typically concentrated on studying problem solving in separate, natural knowledge domains, much of the European research has focused on novel, complex problems, and has been performed with computerized scenarios.

Europe 
In Europe, two main approaches have surfaced, one initiated by Donald Broadbent in the United Kingdom and the other one by Dietrich Dörner in Germany. The two approaches share an emphasis on relatively complex, semantically rich, computerized laboratory tasks, constructed to resemble real-life problems. The approaches differ somewhat in their theoretical goals and methodology, however. The tradition initiated by Broadbent emphasizes the distinction between cognitive problem-solving processes that operate under awareness versus outside of awareness, and typically employs mathematically well-defined computerized systems. The tradition initiated by Dörner, on the other hand, has an interest in the interplay of the cognitive, motivational, and social components of problem solving, and utilizes very complex computerized scenarios that contain up to 2,000 highly interconnected variables.

North America 
In North America, initiated by the work of Herbert A. Simon on "learning by doing" in semantically rich domains, researchers began to investigate problem solving separately in different natural knowledge domainssuch as physics, writing, or chess playingthus relinquishing their attempts to extract a global theory of problem solving. Instead, these researchers have frequently focused on the development of problem solving within a certain domain, that is on the development of expertise.

Areas that have attracted rather intensive attention in North America include:
 Reading
 Writing
 Calculation
 Political decision making
 Managerial problem solving
 Lawyers' reasoning
 Mechanical problem solving
 Problem solving in electronics
 Computer skills
 Game playing
 Personal problem solving
 Mathematical problem solving
 Social problem solving
 Problem solving for innovations and inventions: TRIZ

Characteristics of complex problems 

Complex problem solving (CPS) is distinguishable from simple problem solving (SPS). When dealing with SPS there is a singular and simple obstacle in the way. But CPS comprises one or more obstacles at a time. In a real-life example, a surgeon at work has far more complex problems than an individual deciding what shoes to wear. As elucidated by Dietrich Dörner, and later expanded upon by Joachim Funke, complex problems have some typical characteristics as follows:

 Complexity (large numbers of items, interrelations and decisions)
 enumerability
 heterogeneity
 connectivity (hierarchy relation, communication relation, allocation relation)
 Dynamics (time considerations)
 temporal constraints
 temporal sensitivity
 phase effects
 dynamic unpredictability
 Intransparency (lack of clarity of the situation)
 commencement opacity
 continuation opacity
 Polytely (multiple goals)
 inexpressivenes
 opposition
 transience

Collective problem solving

Problem solving is applied on many different levels − from the individual to the civilizational. Collective problem solving refers to problem solving performed collectively.

Social issues and global issues can typically only be solved collectively.

It has been noted that the complexity of contemporary problems has exceeded the cognitive capacity of any individual and requires different but complementary expertise and collective problem solving ability.

Collective intelligence is shared or group intelligence that emerges from the collaboration, collective efforts, and competition of many individuals.

Collaborative problem solving is about people working together face-to-face or in online workspaces with a focus on solving real world problems. These groups are made up of members that share a common concern, a similar passion, and/or a commitment to their work. Members are willing to ask questions, wonder, and try to understand common issues. They share expertise, experiences, tools, and methods. These groups can be assigned by instructors, or may be student regulated based on the individual student needs. The groups, or group members, may be fluid based on need, or may only occur temporarily to finish an assigned task. They may also be more permanent in nature depending on the needs of the learners. All members of the group must have some input into the decision-making process and have a role in the learning process. Group members are responsible for the thinking, teaching, and monitoring of all members in the group. Group work must be coordinated among its members so that each member makes an equal contribution to the whole work. Group members must identify and build on their individual strengths so that everyone can make a significant contribution to the task. Collaborative groups require joint intellectual efforts between the members and involve social interactions to solve problems together. The knowledge shared during these interactions is acquired during communication, negotiation, and production of materials. Members actively seek information from others by asking questions. The capacity to use questions to acquire new information increases understanding and the ability to solve problems. Collaborative group work has the ability to promote critical thinking skills, problem solving skills, social skills, and self-esteem. By using collaboration and communication, members often learn from one another and construct meaningful knowledge that often leads to better learning outcomes than individual work.

In a 1962 research report, Douglas Engelbart linked collective intelligence to organizational effectiveness, and predicted that pro-actively 'augmenting human intellect' would yield a multiplier effect in group problem solving: "Three people working together in this augmented mode [would] seem to be more than three times as effective in solving a complex problem as is one augmented person working alone".

Henry Jenkins, a key theorist of new media and media convergence draws on the theory that collective intelligence can be attributed to media convergence and participatory culture. He criticizes contemporary education for failing to incorporate online trends of collective problem solving into the classroom, stating "whereas a collective intelligence community encourages ownership of work as a group, schools grade individuals". Jenkins argues that interaction within a knowledge community builds vital skills for young people, and teamwork through collective intelligence communities contributes to the development of such skills.

Collective impact is the commitment of a group of actors from different sectors to a common agenda for solving a specific social problem, using a structured form of collaboration.

After World War II the UN, the Bretton Woods organization and the WTO were created; collective problem solving on the international level crystallized around these three types of organizations from the 1980s onward. As these global institutions remain state-like or state-centric it has been called unsurprising that these continue state-like or state-centric approaches to collective problem-solving rather than alternative ones.

Crowdsourcing is a process of accumulating the ideas, thoughts or information from many independent participants, with aim to find the best solution for a given challenge. Modern information technologies allow for massive number of subjects to be involved as well as systems of managing these suggestions that provide good results. With the Internet a new capacity for collective, including planetary-scale, problem solving was created.

See also

 Actuarial science
 Analytical skill
 Creative problem-solving
 Collective intelligence
 Community of practice
 Coworking
 Crowdsolving
 Divergent thinking
 Grey problem
 Innovation
 Instrumentalism
 Problem statement
 Problem structuring methods
 Psychedelics in problem-solving experiment
 Structural fix
 Subgoal labeling
 Troubleshooting
 Wicked problem

Notes

Further reading
 
 
 
 
 
 
 
 
 
 
 
 
 
 
 
 
 
 
 
 
 
 
 

 
 
 Tonelli M. (2011). Unstructured Processes of Strategic Decision-Making. Saarbrücken, Germany: Lambert Academic Publishing.

External links

 
Reasoning
Artificial intelligence
Educational psychology
Neuropsychological assessment
Psychology articles needing expert attention